The Football Association of Sarawak, also known as FAS (Malay: Persatuan Bola Sepak Sarawak) is the governing body of football for the Malaysian region of Sarawak. They are responsible for the governance of football at all levels in Sarawak, developing youth football squad, women development squad, developing and guidance amateur clubs, coaching education etc. The association is also sometimes referred to FA Sarawak as to differentiate it from the Football Association of Selangor who used the same abbreviation of FAS and are also under the same parent body, the Football Association of Malaysia (FAM).

Football Association of Sarawak aims to establish safe and structured football opportunities for the benefit of all concerned irrespective of age, colour, gender and ability. The FAS provide the appropriate structures and systems to enable the association to manage, regulate and promote the game of football within the state. This also enables them to assist with the development of the game at all levels, ensuring they are able to increase the quality and levels of participation across a broad spectrum of players, officials, parents and supporters in the state of Sarawak. Beside that, they are also helping in developing football in schools, women football and development of amateur football clubs in Sarawak.

FAS' headquarters is located at the Stadium Negeri Sarawak, Jalan Stadium, Petra Jaya 93050 , Kuching, Sarawak.

History
Football fields have existed in the Kingdom of Sarawak before World War I, such as in Bidi, Buso, Dalian and Rajang River. Sarawak footballers at the time were mainly composed of European assistants and Asian staff. In 1824, a team named as the Kuching Wanderers were formed, mainly consisting of Europeans ancestry. On 16 January 1928, the Wanderers were transformed into Kuching Football Club. Until 1956, the team played regularly twice a week including in James Buchanan Cup, a cup named after the fifteenth President of the United States, James Buchanan. 

Regular matches however stopped in 1933 as several players left the country due to the world's economic slump. The following year, the Kuching Football Association (as the predecessor of the current association) was officially founded. From the 1950s until 1963, Sarawak competed in the Borneo Cup together with North Borneo football team and Brunei national football team. Following the formation of the Federation of Malaysia, the team subsequently joined the mainstream Malaysian football. However, in the 1970s, Sarawak football facing a decline and the management went bankrupt. 

Not much was recorded about the existence of FAS but much of their history is intertwined with the defunct Sarawak FA football team, a team which the association had devoted a lot of time to when it competed in the Malaysia football league system from 1974 to 2021. Thus in order to know about the history of FAS, one must look at the history of the Sarawak FA football team.

The current Football Association of Sarawak was founded in 1974 by Haji Taha Ariffin with assistance from the Sarawak state government. Its constitution was subsequently rewritten with a major overhaul was made to change the old management, and the team established the Sarawak Cup. With the association progressed greatly, Sarawak qualify into the Malaysia Cup for the first time in 1978 and enter the competition in 1979.

Officials

Executive committee 
as of 2021

Source:

References

Football associations in Malaysia
Kuching
Football in Sarawak
Sports organizations established in 1974
Sarawak FA
1974 establishments in Malaysia